LSM(R)-197 was a United States Navy vessel laid down at Charleston Navy Yard, Charleston, South Carolina. The ship was commissioned on 8 December 1944.

Design
LSM(R)-197 was one of twelve amphibious ships that evolved during World War II as battle experience identified new weapon requirements for the invasion of the Japanese home islands. These came out of modifications and conversions of LTC's, LCM's and LSM's.

In 1944 with the US Navy's mounting of a 5-inch/38 gun and rocket launchers on the LSM its mission to landing troop fire support out to 4,000 yards beyond the beach, they were to be used during the planned Invasion of Japan to be used for illumination, harassment and high trajectory fire to destroy reverse slope targets.

Service history
During World War II the ship was assigned to the Fifth Fleet under Admiral Raymond A. Spruance. After reaching the front lines after being commissioned in San Diego, she came into action during the invasion of the Kerma Retto islands and served on the Okinawa Radar Picket Line. The class was mentioned in a Life magazine on 14 April 1945.

References

LSM-LSMR WW II Amphiious forces Vol. II, Turner Publishing Co., 1996
Stewart, James M. (2003) "90 Day Naval Wonder"
Friedman, Norman (2002) "US Amphibious Ships and Crafts" Naval Institute Press, Annapolis, MD
Francis, Dennis L.,Commander LSM Flotilla NINE, USS LC(FF) 525, Flagship April 1945

World War II amphibious warfare vessels of the United States
1944 ships
LSM(R)-188-class landing ships medium